Ed Hill may refer to:

 E. D. Hill, American journalist and news anchor for CNN
 Edwin D. Hill, electrical worker, labor union activist and labor leader in the United States
 Ed Hill, American country music songwriter